Adrien Étienne Gaudez (2 February 1845 – 23 January 1902) was a French sculptor who worked in the 19th century. He produced several monumental figures that were cast in bronze. Gaudez studied sculpture under the tutelage of Francois Jouffroy at the École des Beaux-Arts and in 1870 was a prisoner of war during the Franco-Prussian War.

Life and career

Gaudez was born in Lyon, France, on 2 February 1845. He was a pupil of Francois Jouffroy at the École des Beaux-Arts in Paris in 1862. He made his debut at the Paris Salon in 1864. Gaudez worked almost exclusively in bronze and he produced a wide array of sculptures, ranging from genre subjects to military and patriotic themes. His earlier work was mostly of a classical nature but in the latter part of his career he produced some sculpture that can be categorized as art nouveau.

Prisoner of war
He was a prisoner of war in the Franco-Prussian War in 1870.  Having first-hand knowledge of the war, he executed a statue in memory of the French prisoners held in Magdeburg by the Prussian forces. The statue was erected in the city's cemetery. He participated in the Paris Salon of 1878 with the plaster sculpture titled Jupiter's Childhood.

Death and legacy
Gaudez died in Neuilly-sur-Seine, France, on 23 January 1902. He is best known for his monumental sculptures.

Works

Included among the most recognizable known works of Gaudez are the following:
 Florian monument, Alès
 Memorial of the Franco-Prussian War, the dead of Remiremont County, opened by Raymond Poincaré, then Minister of Public Instruction in 1892
 Hebe statue in Neuilly-sur-Seine
 Antoine-Augustin Parmentier statue, Neuilly-sur-Seine
 Memorial statue of Jean-Rodolphe Perronet 
 Glory to the Job – Gloire au travail, 1890
 The Return of the Swallows – Le retour des hirondelles
 The Law – Le Devoir
 Ferronnier XIV=Siecle
 Allegory of Science and Literature
 Bust of Louis Pasteur
 Statuette of Mozart playing the violin
 Lully as a child, 1885, plaster model, Petit Palais, Paris

Gallery

References

19th-century French sculptors
French male sculptors
Sculptors from Lyon
1845 births
1902 deaths
19th-century French male artists